Sir Edmund Buckley, 1st Baronet (16 April 1834 – 21 March 1910) was a British landowner and Conservative politician who sat in the House of Commons from 1865 to 1878.

Buckley was born as Edmund Peck, the illegitimate son of Edmund Buckley of Ardwick in Manchester. He assumed the name of Buckley by Royal Licence in 1864 and inherited considerable estates in Lancashire and Wales including the estate at Dinas Mawddwy. He became involved in slate quarrying  at the Hendre Ddu Slate and Slab Co. for which was built the Hendre-Ddu Tramway.  He was a Deputy Lieutenant and J.P. for Merionethshire.

At the 1865 general election Buckley was elected Member of Parliament for Newcastle-under-Lyme, the same seat his father had previously held. He was created a baronet on 11 December 1868.  At the 1868 general election he was re-elected for Newcastle-under-Lyme and held the seat until 1878, when he resigned from the Commons by taking the Chiltern Hundreds. In 1872 he built a lavish Victorian gothic mansion at Dinas Mawddwy called "Y Plas".  In 1873 he built a hotel, reputedly the oldest reinforced concrete building in Europe, which was called the Buckley Arms hotel.

A slump in the slate industry together with the failure of some of his other businesses led to his financial collapse in 1876, and he had to declare bankruptcy. Despite having inherited a vast fortune, he had so over-invested both at Dinas Mawddwy and elsewhere that the entire inheritance was gone; indeed Buckley was £500,000 in debt, an almost unbelievable amount in the 1870s. Buckley had to sell off most of his estates to pay his debts. One asset he did retain was the Mawddwy Railway – but with no capital to spend on it.

Buckley died at the age of 75.

Buckley married Sarah Rees, daughter of William Rees of Tonn near Llandovery, Wales in 1860. Sarah died in 1883 and Buckley married her cousin Sarah Mysie Burton (née Jenkins), daughter of Evan Jenkins, Rector of Loughor in 1885  His son by his first marriage, also called Edmund Buckley, born in 1861, inherited the Baronetcy on his father's death.

References

External links

1834 births
1910 deaths
Conservative Party (UK) MPs for English constituencies
UK MPs 1865–1868
UK MPs 1868–1874
UK MPs 1874–1880
Baronets in the Baronetage of the United Kingdom
Deputy Lieutenants of Merionethshire
Members of the Parliament of the United Kingdom for Newcastle-under-Lyme
19th-century British landowners
Dinas Mawddwy
19th-century British businesspeople